Żdżenice  is a village in the administrative district of Gmina Malanów, within Turek County, Greater Poland Voivodeship, in west-central Poland.

The village has a population of 346.

History:

In the Neolithic period there is a significant intensification of the presence of human groups in the area.  
Bronze Age brings changes in the materials used and produced tools. Mass graveyards began to appear to bury their dead. An example of such a mass burial is the graveyard of about 1000 BC, discovered in Żdżenice. 
Successive groups of people appeared in late period of Iron Age. Later, the territory remained under the strong influence of Celtic culture.  In this time, there were already ties with trade routes, which pass through the lands of today's "Wielkopolska" Greater Poland, towards the Baltic Sea.  Roman merchants frequently visited area as well.
Roman ties can explain rare (in Poland) "Haplogroup J2 (M172)" genes in Zdzienicki clan, with Korab shield. Zdzienicki clan has its roots in Zdzienice.

References

Villages in Turek County